Boris Atanasov Gaganelov (7 October 1941 – 5 June 2020) was a Bulgarian football player and later coach.

Gaganelov was born in Petrich. He made 51 appearances for the Bulgaria national football team. He represented Bulgaria at the FIFA World Cups in 1966 and 1970.

He died on 5 June 2020 at the age of 78 in Sofia.

Honours

Player
CSKA Sofia
 A Group (7): 1960–61, 1961–62, 1965–66, 1968–69, 1970–71, 1971–72, 1972–73
 Bulgarian Cup (6): 1961, 1965, 1969, 1972, 1973, 1974

References

External links

1941 births
2020 deaths
Bulgarian footballers
Bulgaria international footballers
1966 FIFA World Cup players
1970 FIFA World Cup players
PFC CSKA Sofia players
First Professional Football League (Bulgaria) players
Bulgarian football managers
People from Petrich
Macedonian Bulgarians
Association football defenders
Sportspeople from Blagoevgrad Province